Loyola University School of Law may refer to:

 Loyola Law School, Los Angeles
 Loyola University Chicago School of Law
 Loyola University New Orleans College of Law